The Monowai River is a river in New Zealand, draining Lake Monowai into the Waiau River and feeding the Monowai Power Station.

See also
List of rivers of New Zealand

References

Rivers of Southland, New Zealand
Rivers of New Zealand